The 2016–17 North Dakota State Bison men's basketball team represented North Dakota State University in the 2016–17 NCAA Division I men's basketball season. The Bison, led by third-year head coach David Richman, played their home games at the Scheels Center in Fargo, North Dakota and were members of The Summit League. They finished the season 19–11, 11–5 in Summit League play to finish in second place. They were upset by IUPUI in the quarterfinals of the Summit League tournament.

Previous season
The Bison finished the 2015–16 season 20–13, 8–8 in Summit League play to finish in fifth place. They defeated IUPUI and IPFW to advance to the championship game of The Summit League tournament where they lost to South Dakota State. Despite having 20 wins, they did not participate in a postseason tournament.

Roster

Schedule and results

|-
!colspan=9 style=| Exhibition

|-
!colspan=9 style=| Non-conference regular season

|-
!colspan=9 style=| Summit League regular season

|-
!colspan=9 style=| The Summit League tournament

References

North Dakota State Bison men's basketball seasons
North Dakota State
Bison
Bison